The Boeing 376 (sometimes referred to as the BSS-376, and previously as the HS-376) is a communications satellite bus introduced in 1978 by Hughes Space and Communications Company. It was a spin-stabilized bus that the manufacturer claims was the first standardized platform.

Design 
The satellite bus was designed and manufactured by Hughes. This spin-stabilized platform had two main sections. The spinning section was kept rotating at 50 rpm to maintain attitude, and a despun section was used by the payload to maintain radio coverage.

The spinning section included the apogee kick motor, most of the attitude control, the power subsystem and the command and telemetry subsystems. The despun section contained the communications payload, including the antennas and transponders.

Its power system generated approximately 1,100 to 1,200 watts of power at beginning of life, thanks to two cylindrical solar panels. The bottom panel was retracted around the body and top panel for launch, and extended downwards for operation. It also had two NiCd batteries for solar eclipses.

Versions 
There were four variations of this platform:
 HS-376: The original version of the platform was launched in 1977.
 HS-376L: The Longer life version of the platform was launched in 1991. It had reduced power of 700 Watts and reduced electronics weight, which allowed for increased station keeping propellant supply. This lengthened the design life to 13.5 years.
 HS-376HP: A Higher Power version of the platform was launched in 1995.
 HS-376W: The Wide version of the platform was launched in 1990. It was wider, more powerful and modernized electronics. It was a joint development with INPE.

Satellites 
The HS-376 was a very successful satellite platform with 58 satellites ordered, built and launched. It was also the first satellite to launch from the Space Shuttle.

See also

 Boeing 601
 Boeing Satellite Development Center

References 

Satellite buses